Michael Ole Phillipson Gover (31 August 1913 – 2 May 1987) was an English actor best known for his portrayal of Arthur Russell in the BBC television series Survivors. He started acting late in life after failing in his dream of being an astronaut, and first appeared in an episode of The Avengers Man in the Mirror in 1963 as "One Six". He returned to the show two episodes later, in the same role.

His other television appearances include 10 episodes of Z-Cars, The Troubleshooters, Dixon of Dock Green, Softly, Softly, Randall and Hopkirk (Deceased) and Doomwatch.

His movie roles include the prison governor in A Clockwork Orange (1971) and one of the Elders in Superman (1978).

Filmography

References

External links
 
 Website connected to Equity - Actors Union in Great Britain. Mentions Govers full name - Just scroll down the alphabetical list until you find the name. Its alphabetical by the actors first name so look for "Michael"
 Shows death year. Govers name is the next to last from the bottom.

1913 births
1987 deaths
Danish emigrants to the United Kingdom
English male television actors
20th-century English male actors